Tongwadian, may refer to:

 Tongwadian (Dali), on Mount Jizu, in Dali, Yunnan, China

 Guangzong Temple (Mount Wutai), more commonly known as the Tongwadian, on Mount Wutai, in Taihuai Town of Wutai County, Shanxi, China